Mate Nemeš (born 21 July 1993) is a Serbian Greco-Roman wrestler. He is a gold medalist at the World Wrestling Championships and the European Wrestling Championships.

Career 

He won one of the bronze medals in the 67 kg event at the 2019 World Wrestling Championships held in Nur-Sultan, Kazakhstan. In the same year, he also represented Serbia at the 2019 European Games in Minsk, Belarus and he won one of the bronze medals in the 67 kg event.

At the 2019 Military World Games held in Wuhan, China, he also won one of the bronze medals in the 67 kg event.

He competed in the 67 kg event at the 2020 Summer Olympics held in Tokyo, Japan.

Personal life 

He is a member of the Hungarian community in Serbia. His twin brother Viktor Nemeš is a fellow wrestler and world champion.

Achievements

References

External links 
 

Living people
1993 births
People from Senta
Hungarians in Vojvodina
Place of birth missing (living people)
Serbian male sport wrestlers
Wrestlers at the 2019 European Games
European Games bronze medalists for Serbia
European Games medalists in wrestling
World Wrestling Championships medalists
European Wrestling Championships medalists
European champions for Serbia
Wrestlers at the 2020 Summer Olympics
Olympic wrestlers of Serbia
European Wrestling Champions
World Wrestling Champions